The 1921 Muncie Flyers season was their second and final season in the National Football League. The team failed to improve on their previous record against league opponents of 0–1, losing two games. They tied for eighteenth place in the league. The team folded after the season, finishing 0–3 against NFL opponents as a league franchise.

Schedule

 Game in italics is against a non-NFL team.

Standings

References

Muncie Flyers seasons
Muncie Flyers
Muncie Flyers
National Football League winless seasons